The 2007–08 Welsh Premier League was the 16th season of the Welsh Premier League since its establishment in 1992 as the League of Wales. It began on 17 August 2007 and ended on 19 April 2008. The league was won by Llanelli, their first league title.

League table

Results

Top scorers

Monthly awards

References

External links
Soccerway
rsssf
Welsh Premier League Football

Cymru Premier seasons
1